

Subfamily Libytheinae: snouts

 American snout, Libytheana carinenta

Subfamily Heliconiinae: heliconians and fritillaries

 Gulf fritillary, Agraulis vanillae
 Alberta fritillary, Boloria alberta
 Astarte fritillary, Boloria astarte
 Distinct Astarte fritillary, Boloria astarte distincta
 Meadow fritillary, Boloria bellona
 Arctic fritillary, Boloria chariclea
 Pacific fritillary, Boloria epithore
 Bog fritillary, Boloria eunomia
 Freija fritillary, Boloria freija
 Frigga fritillary, Boloria frigga
 Dingy fritillary, Boloria improba
 Uncompahgre dingy fritillary, Boloria improba acrocnema
 Wind River dingy fritillary, Boloria improba harryi
 Relict fritillary, Boloria kriemhild
 Purplish fritillary, Boloria montinus
 Mountain fritillary, Boloria napaea
 Cryptic fritillary, Boloria natazhati
 Polaris fritillary, Boloria polaris
 Silver-bordered fritillary, Boloria selene
 Mexican silverspot, Dione moneta
 Banded orange heliconian, Dryadula phaetusa
 Julia heliconian, Dryas iulia
 Least heliconian, Euiedes aliphera
 Isabella's heliconian, Eueides isabella
 Variegated fritillary, Euptoieta claudia
 Mexican fritillary, Euptoieta hegesia
 Zebra heliconian, Heliconius charithonia
 Erato heliconian, Heliconius erato
 Tiger heliconian, Heliconius ismenius
 Unsilvered fritillary, Speyeria adiaste
 Aphrodite fritillary, Speyeria aphrodite
 Atlantis fritillary, Speyeria atlantis
 Callippe fritillary, Speyeria callippe
 Carol's fritillary, Speyeria carolae
 Coronis fritillary, Speyeria coronis
 Great spangled fritillary, Speyeria cybele
 Diana fritillary, Speyeria diana
 Edward's fritillary, Speyeria edwardsii
 Great Basin fritillary, Speyeria egleis
 Northwestern fritillary, Speyeria hesperis
 Hydaspe fritillary, Speyeria hydaspe
 Regal fritillary, Speyeria idalia
 Mormon fritillary, Speyeria mormonia
 Nokomis fritillary, Speyeria nokomis
 Zerene fritillary, Speyeria zerene

Subfamily Nymphalinae: true brushfoots

[[Image:American Lady Vanessa virginiensis Upper Wings 1609px.jpg|thumb|American lady, Vanessa virginiensis]]

 Dotted checkerspot, Poladryas minuta Arachne checkerspot, Poladryas arachne Theona checkerspot, Thessalia theona Chinati checkerspot, Thessalia chinatiensis Black checkerspot, Thessalia cyneas Fulvia checkerspot, Thessalia fulvia Leanira checkerspot, Thessalia leanira California patch, Chlosyne californica Bordered patch, Chlosyne lacinia Definite patch, Chlosyne definita Banded patch, Chlosyne endeis Crimson patch, Chlosyne janais Rosita patch, Chlosyne rosita Red-spotted patch, Chlosyne melitaeoides Gorgone checkerspot, Chlosyne gorgone Silvery checkerspot, Chlosyne nycteis Harris's checkerspot, Chlosyne harrisii Nuevo León checkerspot, Chlosyne kendallorum Northern checkerspot, Chlosyne palla Rockslide checkerspot, Chlosyne whitneyi Sagebrush checkerspot, Chlosyne acastus Gabb's checkerspot, Chlosyne gabbii Hoffmann's checkerspot, Chlosyne hoffmanni Elf, Microtia elva Tiny checkerspot, Dymasia dymas Dymasia dymas chara Elada checkerspot, Texola elada Smudged crescent, Castilia eranites Texan crescent, Phyciodes texana Texan Texan crescent, Phyciodes texana texana Seminole Texan crescent, Phyciodes texana seminole Cuban crescent, Phyciodes frisia Pale-banded crescent, Phyciodes tulcis Orange-patched crescent, Phyciodes drusilla Ardent crescent, Phyciodes ardys Black crescent, Phyciodes ptolyca Pine crescent, Phyciodes sitalces Chestnut crescent, Phyciodes argentea Vesta crescent, Phyciodes vesta Phaon crescent, Phyciodes phaon Pearl crescent, Phyciodes tharos Northern crescent, Phyciodes cocyta Diminutive northern crescent, Phyciodes cocyta diminutor Mimic northern crescent, Phyciodes cocyta incognitus Tawny crescent, Phyciodes batesii Field crescent, Phyciodes campestris Painted crescent, Phyciodes picta California crescent, Phyciodes orseis Pale crescent, Phyciodes pallida Mylitta crescent, Phyciodes mylitta Gillett's checkerspot, Euphydryas gillettii Variable checkerspot, Euphydryas chalcedona Chalcedon variable checkerspot, Euphydryas chalcedona chalcedona Snowberry variable checkerspot, Euphydryas chalcedona colon Anicia variable checkerspot, Euphydryas chalcedona anicia Edith's checkerspot, Euphydryas editha Baltimore checkerspot, Euphydryas phaeton Question mark, Polygonia interrogationis Eastern comma, Polygonia comma Satyr comma, Polygonia satyrus Green comma, Polygonia faunus Green green comma, Polygonia faunus faunus Polygonia faunus hylas Sylvan green comma, Polygonia faunus silvius Hoary comma, Polygonia gracilis Zephyr hoary comma, Polygonia gracilis zephyrus Oreas comma, Polygonia oreas Gray comma, Polygonia progne Compton tortoiseshell, Nymphalis vaualbum California tortoiseshell, Nymphalis californica Mourning cloak, Nymphalis antiopa Milbert's tortoiseshell, Aglais milberti Small tortoiseshell, Aglais urticae American lady, Vanessa virginiensis Painted lady, Vanessa cardui West Coast lady, Vanessa annabella Red admiral, Vanessa atalanta Orange mapwing, Hypanartia lethe Mimic, Hypolimnas misippus Common buckeye, Junonia coenia Gray buckeye, Junonia grisea Mangrove buckeye, Junonia neildi Dark buckeye, Junonia nigrosuffusa Twintip buckeye, Junonia stemosa Caribbean buckeye, Junonia zonalis White peacock, Anartia jatrophae Cuban peacock, Anartia chrysopelea Banded peacock, Anartia fatima Malachite, Siproeta stelenes Rusty-tipped page, Siproeta epaphusSubfamily Limenitidinae: admirals, sisters and others

 Red-spotted admiral, Limenitis arthemis White admiral, Limenitis arthemis arthemis Red-spotted purple, Limenitis arthemis astyanax Viceroy, Limenitis archippus Weidemeyer's admiral, Limenitis weidemeyerii Lorquin's admiral, Limenitis lorquini Band-celled sister, Adelpha fessonia California sister, Adelpha bredowii Eyed sister, Adelpha paroeca Spot-celled sister, Adelpha basiloides Mexican sister, Adelpha diazi Rayed sister, Adelpha lycorias melanthe Common banner, Epiphile adrasta Orange banner, Temenis laothoe Mexican bluewing, Myscelia ethusa Blackened bluewing, Myscelia cyanathe Whitened bluewing, Myscelia cyaniris Dingy purplewing, Eunica monima Florida purplewing, Eunica tatila Four-spotted sailor, Dynamine postverta Blue-eyed sailor, Dynamine dyonis Small-eyed sailor, Dynamine artisemia Orange-striped eighty-eight, Diaethria pandama Common Mestra, Mestra amymone Red rim, Biblis hyperia Red cracker, Hamadryas amphinome Gray cracker, Hamadryas februa Variable cracker, Hamadryas feronia Glaucous cracker, Hamadryas glauconome Pale cracker, Hamadryas amphichloe Guatemalan cracker, Hamadryas guatemalena Black-patched cracker, Hamadryas atlantis Orion cecropian, Historis odius Tailed cecropian, Historis acheronta Blomfild's beauty, Smyrna blomfildia Waiter daggerwing, Marpesia coresia Many-banded daggerwing, Marpesia chiron Ruddy daggerwing, Marpesia petreus Antillean daggerwing, Marpesia eleucheaSubfamily Charaxinae: leafwings

 Tropical leafwing, Anaea aidea Goatweed leafwing, Anaea andria Pointed leafwing, Anaea eurypyle Florida leafwing, Anaea floridalis Guatemalan leafwing, Anaea forreri Angled leafwing, Anaea glycerium Pale-spotted leafwing, Anaea pithyusa One-spotted prepona, Archaeoprepona demophonSubfamily Apaturinae: emperors

 Hackberry emperor, Asterocampa celtis Tawny emperor, Asterocampa clyton Cream-banded dusky emperor, Asterocampa idyja argus Empress Leilia, Asterocampa leilia Silver emperor, Doxocopa laure Pavon emperor, Doxocopa pavonSubfamily Morphinae: morphos

 White morpho, Morpho polyphemus Split-banded owlet, Opsiphanes cassina Orange owlet, Opsiphanes boisduvaliiSubfamily Satyrinae: satyrs

 Southern pearly-eye, Enodia portlandia Northern pearly-eye, Enodia anthedon Creole pearly-eye, Enodia creola Eyed brown, Satyrodes eurydice Appalachian brown, Satyrodes appalachia Nabokov's satyr, Cyllopsis pyracmon Horsetail gemmed-satyr, Cyllopsis pseudopephredo Canyonland satyr, Cyllopsis pertepida Gemmed satyr, Cyllopsis gemma Carolina satyr, Hermeuptychia sosybius Hermeuptychia hermybius Hermeuptychia intricata Georgia satyr, Neonympha areolata Mitchell's satyr, Neonympha mitchellii Helicta satyr, Neonympha helicta Little wood-satyr, Megisto cymela Red satyr, Megisto rubricata Pine satyr, Paramacera allyni White satyr, Pareuptychia ocirrhoe Hayden's ringlet, Coenonympha haydenii Common ringlet, Coenonympha tullia Inornate common ringlet, Coenonympha tullia inornata Salt marsh common ringlet, Coenonympha tullia nipisiquit Ochre common ringlet, Coenonympha tullia ochracea California common ringlet, Coenonympha tullia california Common wood-nymph, Cercyonis pegala Mead's wood-nymph, Cercyonis meadii Great Basin wood-nymph, Cercyonis sthenele Small wood-nymph, Cercyonis oetus Vidler's alpine, Erebia vidleri Ross's alpine, Erebia rossii Disa alpine, Erebia disa Taiga alpine, Erebia mancinus Magdalena alpine, Erebia magdalena Banded alpine, Erebia fasciata Red-disked alpine, Erebia discoidalis Theano alpine, Erebia theano Four-dotted alpine, Erebia dabanensis (includes youngi)
 Common alpine, Erebia epipsodea Colorado alpine, Erebia callias Reddish alpine, Erebia kozhantshikovi (includes lafontainei)
 Eskimo alpine, Erebia occulta Red-bordered satyr, Gyrocheilus patrobas Riding's satyr, Neominois ridingsii Great Arctic, Oeneis nevadensis Macoun's Arctic, Oeneis macounii Chryxus Arctic, Oeneis chryxus Brown chryxus Arctic, Oeneis chryxus chryxus California chryxus Arctic, Oeneis chryxus ivallda Uhler's Arctic, Oeneis uhleri Alberta Arctic, Oeneis alberta White-veined Arctic, Oeneis taygete (distinct from Old World Oeneis bore)
 Jutta Arctic, Oeneis jutta Sentinel Arctic, Oeneis alpina (includes exubitor)
 Melissa Arctic, Oeneis melissa Polixenes Arctic, Oeneis polixenes Early Arctic, Oeneis rosovi (includes philipi)

Subfamily Danainae: milkweed butterflies and clearwings

 Soldier, Danaus eresimus Queen, Danaus gilippus Monarch, Danaus plexippus Klug's clearwing, Dircenna klugii Thick-tipped Greta, Greta morgane Tiger mimic-queen, Lycorea cleobaea Disturbed tigerwing, Mechanitis polymnia Broad-tipped clearwing, Pteronymia cotyttoReferences
Jim P. Brock, Kenn Kaufman (2003). Butterflies of North America. Boston: Houghton Mifflin. .

Further reading
 Glassberg, Jeffrey Butterflies through Binoculars, The West (2001)
 Guppy, Crispin S. and Shepard, Jon H. Butterflies of British Columbia (2001)
 James, David G. and Nunnallee, David Life Histories of Cascadia Butterflies (2011)
 Pelham, Jonathan Catalogue of the Butterflies of the United States and Canada (2008)
 Pyle, Robert Michael The Butterflies of Cascadia'' (2002)

External links
 Butterflies and Moths of North America
 Butterflies of America

Nymphalidae

Lists of butterflies and moths of the United States